Dancesport at the 1998 Asian Games was held in Thai-Japanese Stadium, Bangkok, Thailand from December 7 to 8, 1998 as a demonstration sport.

There were two events at the competition, standard dance and the latin dance,

Medalists

Medal table

Participating nations
A total of 52 athletes from 8 nations competed in dancesport at the 1998 Asian Games:

References

Results

External links
ADSF Website

1998 Asian Games events
1998
Asian Games
1998 Asian Games